1979 Women's Nordic Football Championship was the sixth edition of the Women's Nordic Football Championship tournament. It was held from 5 July to 8 July in Oslo, Fredrikstad and Setskog in Norway.

Standings

Results

Goalscorers 
3 goals
  Lone Smidt Nielsen
2 goals
  Vibeke Mortensen
  Pia Sundhage
  Birgitta Söderström
1 goal
  Britta Ehmsen
  Inge Hindkjær
  Ann Jansson
  Ulla Kaasinen
  Astrid Kristiansen
  Irmeli Leskinen
  Susanne Niemann
  Gunn Lisbeth Nyborg
  Görel Sintorn
Own goal
  Elin Sværen

Sources 
Nordic Championships (Women) 1979 Rec.Sport.Soccer Statistics Foundation
Lautela, Yrjö & Wallén, Göran: Rakas jalkapallo — Sata vuotta suomalaista jalkapalloa, p. 418–419. Football Association of Finland / Teos Publishing 2007. .

Women's Nordic Football Championship
1979–80 in European football
1979 in women's association football
1979–80
1979 in Norwegian football
1979 in Finnish football
1979 in Swedish football
1979 in Danish football
July 1979 sports events in Europe
1979 in Norwegian women's sport